Alyssa Carson (born March 10, 2001) is an American space enthusiast and undergraduate student. She is known for attending numerous space camps and visiting NASA visitor centers across nine states with her father, Bert Carson.

Early life and education 
Carson was born on March 10, 2001, in Hammond, Louisiana, the only daughter of a single father, Bert Carson. She graduated from Baton Rouge International School, a pre-school through 12th grade private school, in 2019. 

Carson attended her first space camp in Huntsville, Alabama at age seven and went on to attend six more. She remains the only person to attend every space camp offered including those in Turkey and Canada. She also attended a Sally Ride Summer Camp at the Massachusetts Institute of Technology in Boston.

Her "NASA Blueberry" branding used on her website and social media platforms is based on the call sign she selected at space camp.

At 16, she participated in the Advanced PoSSUM (Project Polar Suborbital Science in the Upper Mesosphere) Space Academy. At 18, Carson earned her pilot's license. Her training has also included water survival, g force training, micro gravity flights, obtaining scuba certification, and decompression training.

Carson attended classes focused on space physiology at Embry–Riddle Aeronautical University. , she is studying astrobiology at the Florida Institute of Technology.

Career 
In 2013, Carson was the first person to complete the "NASA Passport Program" visiting each of NASA's fourteen visitor centers across nine states. She was then invited to be a panelist at the MER (Mars Exploration Rover) 10 Panel at the Smithsonian National Air and Space Museum in Washington, DC. In she was featured as the Youngest Female Groundbreaker on the Steve Harvey talk show. She was featured in the 2017 documentary The Mars Generation. 

Carson self-published So, You Want to Be an Astronaut (2018) about her passion for space flight, and has written for The Independent. She has given TEDx talks encouraging young girls to pursue careers in STEM in Kalamata, Greece (2014), Bucharest, Romania (2018), and Klagenfurt, Austria (2019).

While frequently described by the media as an "astronaut in training", Carson is not affiliated with any national space program. NASA has publicly stated that the organization "has no official ties to Alyssa Carson", and separately that "although Ms. Carson uses ‘NASA' in her website name and Twitter and Instagram handles, we’re not affiliated at all." In 2019 Newsweek corrected a headline that had implied that Carson's training was affiliated with NASA. Snopes.com also has dedicated a page to clarify such claims, which says: "Carson is not in training with—or being prepped by—NASA to become an astronaut, or to take part in the first human mission to Mars." 

In 2019, Carson appeared on an episode of Ryan's Mystery Playdate. She is also frequently interviewed to discuss her childhood goal of becoming an astronaut and traveling to Mars. She has been involved with several space-related products, including "space luggage" designed by Horizn Studios, and participated in testing Final Frontier Design's spacesuit for the Canadian Space Agency headquarters. She promotes footwear for Nike and home appliances for SodaStream.

Awards 
In 2017, Carson was named one of nine Louisiana Young Heroes, an award given to exceptional high school students by Louisiana Public Broadcasting. In 2019, she received the LSU Women’s Center Esprit de Femme Award, and is the youngest recipient of the award to date. She was honored by Louisiana Life magazine as a 2020 Louisianan of the Year in the science category. In 2022, she received the Florida Institute of Technology's Student Catalyst Award, highlighting women’s participation and development in the school's community.

Bibliography

References

External links

2001 births
Living people
People from Hammond, Louisiana
Florida Institute of Technology alumni